Santa Ana Valley High School, also referred to as Valley High School is located at 1801 S. Greenville St. in Santa Ana, CA 92704. Valley High was built in 1959.

Background

Santa Ana Valley High School was the second high school constructed for the Santa Ana Unified. The School first opened its door on September 14, 1959.

In 2006–07, the school was remodeled for the first time in its history. During this time, all students used the Godinez Fundamental High School campus, which had just been built.  The nickname, 'Valley West' was first used by Lewis Bratcher to note the temporary three block westward move.  This remodeling project included the construction of a brand new Olympic-size swimming pool and the installation of air conditioning in some of the classrooms.

Sports

In 2009–10 Santa Ana Valley Football won the league in a 3-way tie and ended their season at 7–4.
Santa Ana Valley's Football team beat Saddleback high schools team 50–0 and Century high schools team 69–14 both schools are rival Santa Ana schools.

The Santa Ana Valley Girls Water Polo won the Orange League title for the first time in 2009. They set a school record for most games won in a season in the water polo and had a final record of 24–8. In 2011 the Girls Water Polo team broke this record, again won the league and captured the school's first CIF Championship in any girl's sporting event. In 2012 the Girls Water Polo team successfully defended their CIF Championship becoming the first Valley sports team to win back to back CIF championships.

The Santa Ana Valley Boys Water Polo won the Orange League title and made it for the first time to semi-finals of CIF in 2010.

The Santa Ana Valley High School Cross Country Team have been champions since 2002. In 2010-2011 Valley clinched the title for all three levels Varsity, JV, and Frosh/Soph.

At the time of its construction in 2007, Valley was the only high school in Orange County with an on campus golf center.

The 2010–11 football team had a roller coaster of a season. They started the season 4–0 and then lost to the eventual CIF-SS Champions Garden Grove High School 39–6 and to Savanna High School of Anaheim. They won a close game against Century High School 21–20, and then lost 2 out of 3 games and missed the playoffs, a first for head coach Larry Mohr. Valley went on to beat Saddleback 49–14.

The 2011–12 football team won their league in a tie with Anaheim High School. Their record was 7–3 and a playoff loss to Ocean View High School of Huntington Beach, CA. The Falcons  beat the Saddleback Roadrunners 49–0 and Century Centurians 52–12.

The 2003-04 Boys Soccer Team won the CIF Championship after finishing 3rd in league play,  for the first time in boys soccer.

Notable alumni
Ed Caruthers 1968 Olympic Silver Medalist, High Jump
Melvin Lee Davis, bass player, music director
Karl Denson, Saxophonist
Don Hồ, Vietnamese American pop singer
Garry Templeton, St. Louis Cardinals, MLB
Rick Walker, Washington Redskins, NFL
Myron White, Los Angeles Dodgers, MLB, Orange County leading rusher
Gerald Young, Houston Astros, MLB

References

External links
Valley High School
Students' Memories of Valley High School

High schools in Santa Ana, California
Public high schools in California
1959 establishments in California